Cefn-y-Llwyd is a hamlet in the community of Trefeurig, Ceredigion, Wales, which is 74 miles (119.1 km) from Cardiff and 176 miles (283.3 km) from London. Cefn Llwyd is represented in the Senedd by Elin Jones (Plaid Cymru) and is part of the Ceredigion constituency in the House of Commons.

References

See also 
 List of localities in Wales by population

Villages in Ceredigion